Saipa Tehran Volleyball Club (Bâshgâh-e Vâlibâl-e Sâipâ-ye Tehrân) (formerly known as Saipa Alborz) is an Iranian professional volleyball team based in Tehran, Iran. They compete in the Iranian Volleyball Super League. The team is owned by SAIPA, an Iranian automobile manufacturer. Saipa VC is the volleyball club of the multisport Saipa Cultural and Athletic Corporation.

Names
Saipa Tehran (1989–2009)
Saipa Karaj (2009–2010)
Saipa Alborz (2010–2015)
Saipa Tehran (2015–)

Current squad
 1.  Konstantin Mitev
 2.  Moein Moeinifar
 3.  Hamid Amini
 4.  Rashid Yousefi
 5.  Mohammad Fallah
 6.  Asghar Najafi
 8.  Alireza Safaei
 9.  Mohammad Razipour
 10.  Mohammad Daliri
 11.  Rasoul Najafi
 12.  Saeid Javaheri
 13.  Hamed Tariverdi
 14.  Jaber Esmaeilpour
 16.  Mostafa Heydari
 17.  Armin Ranjbar
 18.  Amir Ali Fathali
 19.  Aleksandar Gorbatkov
Heach coach:  Farhad Nafarzadeh
Assistant coach:  Farshad Saeidi

Notable former players
  Evgeni Ivanov
  Aleksandar Simeonov
  Ángel Dennis
  Mehdi Mahdavi
  Saeid Marouf
  Farhad Nazari Afshar
  Mohammad Torkashvand

Honors
Iranian Super League
Runners-up (7): 2006, 2008, 2009, 2010, 2011, 2012, 2019
Third place (1): 2007

Asian Club Championships
Runners-up (1): 2005

External links
  Official club website
  Roster

Iranian volleyball clubs
Sport in Tehran